The name Galloping Gobbler can refer to:

The annual Turkey Trot in Fort Wayne, Indiana
A most valuable player award given for NFL Thanksgiving games, see NFL on Thanksgiving Day#Game MVPs